Harold "Burr" Davis (born c. 1937) was a Canadian football player who played for the Winnipeg Blue Bombers. He won the Grey Cup with them in 1959. Delveaux played college football at the University of Houston where he won letters for his performance. After his football career he coached at Klein High School and St. Thomas High School in Houston.

References

1937 births
Winnipeg Blue Bombers players
Living people
University of Houston alumni
People from Jacksonville, Texas